The southern frogs form the Leptodactylidae, a name that comes from Greek meaning a bird or other animal having slender toes. They are a diverse family of frogs that most likely diverged from other hyloids during the Cretaceous. The family has undergone major taxonomic revisions in recent years, including the reclassification of the former subfamily Eleutherodactylinae into its own family the Eleutherodactylidae; the Leptodactylidae now number 206 species in 13 genera distributed throughout Mexico, the Caribbean, and Central and South America. The family includes terrestrial, burrowing, aquatic, and arboreal members, inhabiting a wide range of habitats.

Several of the genera within the Leptodactylidae lay their eggs in foam nests. These can be in crevices, on the surface of water, or on forest floors. These foam nests are some of the most varied among frogs. When eggs hatch in nests on the forest floor, the tadpoles remain within the nest, without eating, until metamorphosis.

Classification 

As of December 2019, the Amphibian Species of the World classifies the following genera in the family Leptodactylidae:
 Subfamily Leiuperinae Bonaparte, 1850 (90 species)
 Edalorhina Jiménez de la Espada, 1870
 Engystomops Jiménez de la Espada, 1872
 Physalaemus Fitzinger, 1826
 Pleurodema Tschudi, 1838
 Pseudopaludicola Miranda-Ribeiro, 1926
 Subfamily Leptodactylinae Werner, 1896 (1838) (96 species)
 Adenomera Steindachner, 1867
 Hydrolaetare Gallardo, 1963
 Leptodactylus Fitzinger, 1826
 Lithodytes Fitzinger, 1843
 Subfamily Paratelmatobiinae Ohler and Dubois, 2012 (13 species)
 Crossodactylodes Cochran, 1938
 Paratelmatobius Lutz and Carvalho, 1958
 Rupirana Heyer, 1999
 Scythrophrys Lynch, 1971
 Incertae sedis
 "Leptodactylus" ochraceus Lutz, 1930

References

External links 
 Leptodactylidae, from the Tree of Life Web Project
 Leptodactylidae taxonomy, from the NCBI taxonomy browser
 Leptodacylidae classification, from Animal Diversity Web
 Leptodactylid description, from AmphibiaWeb

 
Amphibian families
Maastrichtian first appearances
Taxa named by Franz Werner
Neotropical realm fauna